The Fiesta Bowl is an American college football bowl game played annually in the Phoenix metropolitan area. From its beginning in 1971 until 2006, the game was hosted at the Sun Devil Stadium in Tempe, Arizona. Since 2007, the game has been played at the State Farm Stadium in Glendale, Arizona. Since 2022, it has been sponsored by Vrbo and officially known as the Vrbo Fiesta Bowl. Previous sponsors include PlayStation (December 2016–2022), BattleFrog (January 2016), Vizio (December 2014), Tostitos (1996–January 2014), IBM (1993–1995) and Sunkist (1986–1990).

Since 1992, the Fiesta Bowl has been part of some organization of bowls designed to determine an undisputed national champion. In 1992, it was named as one of the Bowl Coalition games, but the bowl was never used to determine the champion. In 1995, the organizers of the Fiesta Bowl joined with the Sugar Bowl and the Orange Bowl to form the Bowl Alliance, with each bowl guaranteed to host a championship game as the coaches’ poll was contractually obligated to choose the winner of the Bowl Alliance championship game as its national champion. The Fiesta Bowl hosted the first of these games in January 1996.

After the 1997 season, the three Bowl Alliance bowls joined with the Rose Bowl to form the Bowl Championship Series (BCS), with the Fiesta Bowl guaranteed to host the national championship game every four years. As with the Bowl Alliance, the Fiesta Bowl was given first chance at hosting the BCS' championship in 1999; they also hosted the game in 2003. When the BCS reconstituted itself following the 2005 season, it began staging a separate national championship game, which rotated between BCS bowl sites.

Beginning with the 2014 season, Fiesta Bowl became a member of College Football Playoff, hosting a semifinal game every three years; all the teams playing in this bowl will be selected by the CFP Selection Committee in those years. In years that it serves as a semifinal, the winner of the Fiesta Bowl faces the winner of the Peach Bowl in the College Football Playoff National Championship Game the following week. Unlike in the previous years, the National Championship Game is not awarded to the bowl organizations in the CFP; instead, the selection process is similar to the one used to determine a host for the Super Bowl.

The Fiesta Bowl has donated over $12 million to charity. In 2020, it donated $1 million in emergency relief during the COVID-19 pandemic.

History

Origins (1968–1971)

The Fiesta Bowl was born from the Western Athletic Conference's frustrated attempts to obtain bowl invitations for its champions. In 1968 and 1969 respectively, champions Wyoming and Arizona State failed to secure any bowl selection. The next year, undefeated Arizona State was bypassed by the major bowls and had to settle for an appearance in the less prestigious Peach Bowl. The Fiesta Bowl therefore initially provided an automatic berth for the WAC champion.

1970s
In its first decade of existence, the Fiesta Bowl was played in the last week of December (including the afternoon of Christmas Day from 1976 to 1979). The 1971 inaugural game featured another top-ten Arizona State squad against top-twenty opponent Florida State. The 1974 game featured WAC champ BYU and their new coach, future Hall of Fame member LaVell Edwards in their first ever bowl game vs. Oklahoma State. BYU was in control until BYU's first All-American quarterback Gary Sheide went down with a leg injury and eventually lost 16–6. By 1975, the game was able to attract Big Eight co-champion Nebraska to play undefeated Arizona State in a matchup of top-five teams. In 1977, the game was again able to attract a top-five opponent in Penn State, despite WAC champion #16 BYU refusing to play in the bowl due to its being held on Sunday.

In 1978, Arizona and Arizona State both joined the Pac-10 Conference and the Fiesta Bowl's tie-in with the WAC ended as its champ went to the newly inaugurated Holiday Bowl.  From then until the advent of the Bowl Coalition in 1992, Fiesta Bowl matchups typically featured runners-up of major conferences and/or major independents.

1980s
The game continued to attract high quality matchups; beginning with the 1981 season, it shifted to New Year's Day alongside the major bowl games—the Cotton, Orange, Sugar, and Rose. At the time, NBC had the broadcast rights to the Fiesta, Rose, and Orange; the Fiesta was played first and had a late morning kickoff (11:30 a.m. MST). It was the first bowl game to acquire a corporate title sponsor, via an agreement with Sunkist Growers in September 1985, making the game the "Sunkist Fiesta Bowl" starting with the January 1986 edition. The Tangerine Bowl had previously reached agreement in March 1983 with the Florida Citrus Commission, a state government agency, to rename itself as the Florida Citrus Bowl.

A major breakthrough occurred after the 1986 season when the top two teams in the country, Miami and Penn State, agreed to play for the de facto national championship in the Fiesta Bowl. At the time, the traditional four "major" bowl games granted automatic bids to their conference champions. Both Miami and Penn State were independents at that time, and were thus free to choose a bowl. As such, the Fiesta Bowl and the Florida Citrus Bowl, each free from the obligation of conference tie-ins, vied to host the Miami–Penn State matchup in order to ensure that they would meet on the field. The Fiesta Bowl won the bidding and the game was set to be played on Friday, January 2, 1987—the night after the "big four" bowls of New Year's Day. Penn State won  and the game drew the largest television audience in the history of college football at the time. Two years later, #1 Notre Dame played undefeated #3 West Virginia for the national championship at the 1989 Fiesta Bowl on January 1.

The 1987 and 1989 games were two of four straight matchups of teams ranked in the AP Top 10 going into the bowl season to close out the 1980s. This significantly increased the Fiesta Bowl's prestige, to the point that it was now considered a major bowl by many fans and pundits. The 1988 game returned to New Year's Day, and the 1989 game kicked off three hours later (2:30 p.m. MST on NBC) and opposite the Rose Bowl, which had switched networks to ABC.

1990s
Before the 1991 game, several major universities declined invitations due to the State of Arizona's decision at that time not to adopt the Martin Luther King Holiday. However, in 1992, the Fiesta Bowl was invited to participate in the Bowl Coalition, a predecessor to the Bowl Championship Series. This assured the game would feature major conference champions or prestigious runners-up and cemented its status as a major bowl. Had the two top-ranked teams in the Bowl Coalition not come from the SEC, Big Eight or SWC, the Fiesta Bowl would have hosted the Bowl Coalition's "national championship game," though this never happened during the three years of the Bowl Coalition's run.

When the Bowl Coalition was reconfigured as the Bowl Alliance for the 1995 season, the Fiesta was included as one of the three top games. In that season, it hosted the Bowl Alliance National Championship game featuring undefeated #1 Nebraska playing undefeated #2 Florida for the national championship. Nebraska won the game 62–24, the largest win margin in the history of the national championship game, and the most points ever scored in a national championship game. Finally, with the addition of the Big Ten and Pac-10 conferences to the new Bowl Championship Series, the Fiesta Bowl became a permanent fixture in the four-year BCS National Championship Game rotation. In 1998, the Fiesta Bowl featured the first BCS National Championship Game, which Tennessee won over Florida State, 23–16.

Starting with the 1999 season, the  Big 12 Conference champion received an automatic bid to the Fiesta Bowl in years when it was not slated as the BCS title game, an arrangement that continued to the end of the BCS era.

2000s

In 2002, the Fiesta Bowl had the right to take the Pac-10 Conference Champion, should that team not reach the Rose Bowl, which served as the national championship game that season. Oregon failed to qualify for the championship game, and thus played Colorado in the Fiesta Bowl. A similar arrangement was made for the 2006 Fiesta Bowl. However, instead of gaining the Pac-10 Conference champion in addition to their usual tie-in with the Big 12, the Fiesta Bowl would have had a choice of the two teams. This turned out to be a moot point as both the Big 12 champion Texas and Pac-10 champion Southern California qualified for the National Championship Game (USC's participation has since been vacated).

The BCS National Championship game returned to the Fiesta Bowl in 2003 with the Big Ten champions Ohio State Buckeyes beating the Big East champions Miami Hurricanes in the first overtime national championship game. The game went into double overtime with the Buckeyes coming out on top 31–24 to claim the 2002 national championship.

The Fiesta Bowl was the first BCS bowl to have had a team from outside the automatic qualifying (AQ) BCS conferences (the Big 12, Big Ten, Atlantic Coast Conference (ACC), Southeastern Conference (SEC), Pac-10, Big East, and Notre Dame). The 2005 game saw undefeated Utah from the Mountain West Conference become the first BCS non-AQ school ever to play in a BCS game, easily defeating Big East champion Pittsburgh 35–7.

In 2007, the Fiesta Bowl game was played for the first time at the new then-named University of Phoenix Stadium in Glendale, across the Phoenix metropolitan area from Sun Devil Stadium. The undefeated Boise State Broncos won by defeating the Oklahoma Sooners 43–42 in overtime. It has been called one of the greatest college football games ever played, due to the combination of an underdog team, trick plays, comebacks by each team, and a thrilling overtime finish.

2010s
The 2010 Fiesta Bowl featured #6 Boise State defeating #4 TCU, 17–10. It was the first time a BCS bowl matched-up two non-automatic qualifying teams (i.e. two teams from conferences without automatic BCS bids) and the first time that two teams who went undefeated faced each other in a BCS game outside of the national championship. In the 2012 Fiesta Bowl, Oklahoma State defeated Stanford 41–38. Notable players included Brandon Weeden and Justin Blackmon for Oklahoma State, and Andrew Luck for Stanford.

In November 2016, PlayStation was announced as the bowl's new title sponsor.

The December 2016, December 2019, and December 2022 editions served as a semifinal for the College Football Playoff. The Fiesta Bowl will host a semifinal, alongside the Peach Bowl, again in 2025 and 2028.

2020s 
The 50th edition of the Fiesta Bowl featured #10 Iowa State defeating #25 Oregon Ducks 34-17. The game was behind closed doors due to the COVID-19 pandemic in Arizona, with only player's family members admitted. In the 2022 Fiesta Bowl, Oklahoma State rallied from a 28-7 deflict late in the 2nd quarter to defeat Notre Dame 37-35. In the December edition of that game (which was also a CFP semifinal), #3 TCU defeated #2 Michigan 51-45, the highest scoring game in Fiesta Bowl history, and the second-highest scoring CFP semifinal game.

Controversies

Invitations
In 1996, a group of students from Brigham Young University, led by BYU professor Dennis Martin, burned bags of Tostitos tortilla chips in a bonfire and called for a boycott of all Tostitos products. This came after #5 ranked BYU was not invited to play in the 1996 Fiesta Bowl in favor of #7 ranked Penn State. This event is one of those referred to by proponents of college football implementing a playoff series rather than the controversial Bowl Alliance.
Penn State went on to win the game over #20 Texas 38–15, while BYU defeated #14 Kansas State in the Cotton Bowl Classic 19–15.

For the 2010 Fiesta Bowl, the selections of TCU and Boise State caused a great deal of controversy. For the first and only time in the BCS era, two BCS non-AQ teams were chosen to play in BCS bowls in the same bowl season: however, they ended up facing each other in this bowl. Because the two non-AQ teams were placed in the same bowl game, the bowl was derisively referred to as the "Separate But Equal Bowl", the "Quarantine Bowl", the "Fiasco Bowl", the "BCS Kids' Table", etc. Some had called for a boycott because of this arrangement. There was wide speculation that the BCS bowl selection committees maneuvered TCU and Boise State into the same bowl so as to deny them the chances to "embarrass" two AQ conference representatives in separate bowls, as Boise State had done in the 2007 Fiesta Bowl and Utah had done in the 2005 Fiesta Bowl and 2009 Sugar Bowl (prior to the game, non-AQ teams were 3–1 versus AQ teams in BCS bowls). In response, Fiesta Bowl CEO John Junker called those allegations "the biggest load of crap that I've ever heard in my life" and said that "We're in the business of doing things that are on behalf of our bowl game and we don't do the bidding of someone else to our detriment."  Beyond the unappealing nature of a major bowl contest with two programs then perceived as underdogs, the appeal was further diminished as it was a rematch of the Poinsettia Bowl from the previous bowl season.

Financial scandals
In 2009, in the weeks prior to the 2010 Fiesta Bowl, past and present Fiesta Bowl employees alleged that they were encouraged to help maintain its position as one of the four BCS bowls by making campaign contributions to politicians friendly to the Fiesta Bowl, with those contributions subsequently reimbursed to the employees. If the allegations were true, this would have been a violation of both state and federal campaign finance laws.  Furthermore, as a non-profit organization, the Fiesta Bowl is prohibited from making political contributions of any kind.  The Fiesta Bowl commissioned an "independent review" which found "no credible evidence that the bowl's management engaged in any type of illegal or unethical conduct."

The following year, in a November 2010 article, Sports Illustrated reported that Fiesta Bowl officials, including bowl CEO John Junker, spent $4 million since 2000 to curry favor from BCS bigwigs and elected officials, including a 2008 "Fiesta Frolic", a golf-centered gathering of athletic directors and head coaches. The journal also reported that Junker's annual salary was close to $600,000 and that the bowl, in 2007 turned an $11.6 million profit.  While these alleged activities are not illegal, they did result in considerable damage to the reputation of the Fiesta Bowl.

On March 29, 2011, the Fiesta Bowl Board of Directors released a 276-page "scathing internal report", commissioned by them to re-examine the accusations of illegal political activities.  The commission determined that $46,539 of illegal campaign contributions were made and the board immediately fired Fiesta Bowl CEO John Junker, who had already been suspended pending the results of this investigation. The scandal threatened the Fiesta Bowl's status as a BCS game, as the BCS said it might replace the bowl in its lineup if officials could not convince them it should remain.  The BCS ultimately chose not to expel the Fiesta Bowl, instead fining the organization $1 million.

In June 2011 University of Arizona president Robert Shelton was hired to replace Junker.  On February 22, 2012, former CEO John Junker pleaded guilty to a federal felony charge in the campaign financing matter, and two members of his former staff pleaded guilty to misdemeanor charges.  Junker was to be sentenced soon after, facing up to 2.5 years in prison as the result of his plea, but his sentencing was repeatedly postponed in return for cooperation in other cases. On March 13, 2014, Junker was sentenced to eight months in prison, with the sentence starting on June 13, 2014; he was released on February 11, 2015. On March 20, 2014, Junker was sentenced to three years of probation on state charges.

Parade
One of the Fiesta Bowl events, the annual Fiesta Bowl Parade, takes place in downtown Phoenix. It features marching bands from high schools as well as the two universities participating in the Fiesta Bowl, and the two universities participating in the Cactus Bowl, along with floats, equestrian units, and a seven-member queen and court. The parade began in 1973. Grand Marshals include celebrities from sports and entertainment.

In 2018, the sponsor was changed from Bank of Arizona to Desert Financial. Appearances in the 2018 parade included Cindy McCain and the marching band from Salem High School in Salem, New Hampshire, which was the group that had traveled the farthest for the parade.

Game results
Rankings are based on the AP Poll prior to the game being played. Italics denote a tie game.

Source:
Denotes Bowl Alliance Championship Game
Denotes BCS National Championship Game
Denotes College Football Playoff semifinal game

Future games

 denotes game is a College Football Playoff semifinal

MVPs
An offensive MVP and defensive MVP are selected for each game.

Most appearances
Updated through the December 2022 edition (52 games, 104 total appearances).

Teams with a single appearance
Won (5): Iowa State, LSU, Louisville, Oregon State, Utah

Lost (10): Alabama, Baylor, BYU, Connecticut, Florida, Missouri, Stanford, USC, Washington, Wyoming

Tied (1): Arkansas

 Cal and Washington State are the only Pac-12 members that have not appeared in the game.
 Kansas, Texas A&M and Texas Tech are the only current or former Big 8 or Big 12 members that have not appeared in the game.

Appearances by conference
Updated through the December 2022 edition (52 games, 104 total appearances).

 Games marked with an superscript D were played in December.
 Conferences that are defunct or no longer active in FBS are marked in italics.
 Records reflect conference affiliations at the time the game was played.
 Several teams—such as Penn State and Miami (Florida)—have appeared both as an Independent and as a conference member.
 Pac-12 record includes appearances by teams when the conference was the Pac-10 (5–2–1).
 Following the 2013 split of the original Big East along football lines, the FBS schools reorganized as the American Athletic Conference ("The American"), which retains the charter of the original Big East. Teams representing the Big East appeared in 7 games, compiling a 2–5 record.

Game records

Source:

Broadcasting

As of the 2010–11 season, the game along with the rest of the BCS and its successor, the College Football Playoff, exclusively airs on ESPN.  From 2007 through 2010, Fox telecast the game along with the other BCS games – the Sugar Bowl, Orange Bowl, and BCS National Championship Game from 2006 though 2009, while only the Rose Bowl and the 2010 BCS National Championship Game aired on ABC in that period. From 1999 to 2006, the game aired on ABC as part of the first BCS package, and from 1996 to 1998 the game aired on CBS as part of its bowl coverage. Prior to that, NBC aired the game for several years. This game, along with the Orange Bowl, is one of only two bowl games ever to air on all the "Big 4" broadcast television networks in the United States.

ESPN Radio is the current radio home for the Fiesta Bowl.

In 2013, ESPN Deportes provided the first Spanish U.S. telecast of the Fiesta Bowl.

References

External links
 

 
Annual sporting events in the United States
College football bowls
American football in Arizona
Recurring sporting events established in 1971
1971 establishments in Arizona
PlayStation (brand)